Giangreco is an Italian surname. Notable people with the surname include:

Camila Giangreco Campiz (born 1996), Paraguayan tennis player
Dennis Giangreco (born 1952), American author
Mark Giangreco (born 1952), American television sports anchor

Italian-language surnames